Clifford "C. J." Spiller Jr. (born August 5, 1987) is an American football coach and former running back who is currently the running backs coach at Clemson University. He previously served as a graduate intern at Clemson in 2020.

Spiller played college football at Clemson and was recognized as a unanimous All-American. Spiller was drafted by the Buffalo Bills with the ninth overall pick in the 2010 NFL Draft and played in the NFL for 9 seasons with the Bills, New Orleans Saints, Seattle Seahawks, New York Jets  and Kansas City Chiefs.

Early years
Spiller was born in Lake Butler, Florida.  He attended Union County High School in Lake Butler, where he excelled at track and basketball, as well as football. At Union County High School, Spiller played along fellow Clemson teammate, Kevin Alexander. During his senior year at Union County, he rushed for 1,840–yards on 176 carries for 30 touchdowns. He also had fifteen receptions for 249 yards.

In 2006, he was named All-First Coast boys track and field athlete of the year by The Florida Times-Union after winning FHSAA Class 2A state titles in the 100 and 200 meters.

In his high school career, Spiller rushed for 5,511 yards on 541 carries.

High school honors
 Selected to play in 2006 U.S. Army All-American Bowl
 #1 player in Florida, #1 all-purpose running back, and #9 overall player by Rivals.com
 First-team Parade magazine All-American
 Florida 2A state 100 and 200–meter champion; Florida Times-Union All-First Coast boys track and field athlete of the year.

College career
Spiller received an athletic scholarship to attend Clemson University, where he played for the Clemson Tigers football team from 2006 to 2009.

Freshman year
As a true freshman, Spiller immediately made himself known to the Clemson fans. In the season, he rushed for 938 yards and ten touchdowns on 129 rushes, despite being the second-team running back behind James Davis. He scored his first collegiate touchdown in a 34–33 overtime loss to Boston College on an 82–yard touchdown reception from quarterback Will Proctor. After struggling versus Florida State the following week, Spiller turned it around against North Carolina by rushing for fifty-eight yards and two touchdowns in a 52–7 rout of the Tarheels. In the following weeks, Spiller had two triple-digit rushing games as the Tigers defeated Louisiana Tech and Wake Forest. Against Louisiana Tech, he rushed for 127–yards and two touchdowns on eleven attempts, in a 51–0 rout of the Bulldogs, in which the entire Clemson team rushed for 393 yards. In a Gameday-featured game vs. 13th ranked Georgia Tech, Spiller rushed for 116 yards, including a 50-yard touchdown run, as well as catching a 50-yard swing pass touchdown en route to the Tigers 31-7 win. Clemson finished the season with an 8–5 overall record, losing four of their final five games, including a 31-28 loss to archrival South Carolina, and ended the season in a 28–20 Music City Bowl loss to the Kentucky Wildcats. Spiller rushed for only twenty-four yards on five attempts in the loss.

Sophomore year

In his second season for the Tigers, Spiller had a less productive rushing season with only 768 yards and three touchdowns. He did, however, gain more receiving yards, with 271–yards and two additional touchdowns. In the opening three games of the season, Spiller rushed for only eighty-five yards, including a career-worst –1–yards in a 38–10 victory over Furman. In a 13–3 loss, he was again stopped by the Georgia Tech defense, rushing for only two yards. His best statistical game came against rivals South Carolina, which Clemson won 23–21. Spiller ran for a team-high 122 yards on twenty-three attempts in the victory. In the team's bowl game, he rushed for 112–yards on eight attempts, including one touchdown, in a 23–20 loss to Auburn in the Chick-fil-A Bowl.

Junior year
With Spiller and fellow running back James Davis, the Clemson Tigers were favored to win the opening game of their 2008 season against the Alabama Crimson Tide in the Chick-fil-A College Kickoff. However, a stingy Alabama defense held Spiller to just seven yards on two attempts. He did score though, on a kickoff return for a touchdown. In his second game, however, he rushed for seventy-five yards on six carries, which included three touchdowns in a 45–17 victory over The Citadel. Against Virginia later that year, Spiller threw his first career touchdown on a trick play. On January 15, 2009, he announced that he would remain for his senior year at Clemson instead of entering the 2009 NFL Draft.

Senior year
In the Tigers' 40–24 victory over the Florida State Seminoles on November 7, 2009, Spiller and Jacoby Ford became the leading all-purpose duo in NCAA history (a record previously held by Marshall Faulk and Darnay Scott of San Diego State).

On November 28, 2009, Spiller set the FBS record for kickoff return touchdowns with seven during his career. He also earned his spot in the record books in another way on that kickoff return, by being one of five players to ever gain 7,000 all-purpose yards.  Spiller was one of the three finalists for the 2009 Doak Walker Award, and placed sixth in the voting for the Heisman Trophy.

Spiller was selected for the All-Atlantic Coast Conference (ACC) first-team, and was voted the ACC Player of the Year by the members of the Atlantic Coast Sports Media Association.  He was also recognized as a unanimous first-team All-American.  He was the nation's only player that season to account for touchdowns five different ways—rushing, passing, receiving, and on kick and punt returns—and had passing, rushing and receiving touchdowns in one game, a victory against North Carolina State, a first for a player in Clemson history. He returned four kickoffs and a punt for scores that year and had eight total returns for touchdowns during his career.  He scored at least once in every game that season while leading Clemson to the Atlantic Division title and a spot in the league title game against Georgia Tech. Spiller led the ACC with an average of nearly 184 all-purpose yards and was the league's fourth-leading rusher, averaging 76 yards.

Spiller graduated from Clemson in December 2009, becoming the first person in his family to receive a four-year college degree. Also, Clemson retired his No. 28 in recognition of his college career.

Spiller was the only player in the FBS to score a touchdown in every game in the 2009 season.

College statistics

College awards and highlights
 2006 High School All-American (Parade)
 2006 High School All-American (USA Today)
 2006 All-ACC Football (RB)
 2007 All-American – Outdoor Track & Field (4 × 100 m)
 2007 All-ACC Outdoor Track Selection (100m)
 2008 All-ACC Indoor Track Selection (60m)
 2008 All-American – Indoor Track & Field (60m)
 2009 All-ACC Football (RB & ST)
 2009 All-American – Outdoor Track & Field (4 × 100 m)
 2009 All-ACC Outdoor Track Selection (100m)
 2009 All-ACC Football (RB & KR)
 2009 All-American – Football (unanimous)
 2009 ACC Championship Game MVP
 2009 ACC Offensive Player of the Year
 2009 ACC Player of the Year
 2010 #28 retired at Clemson in Spiller's honor

Professional career
Despite being projected as a first-round pick in the 2009 NFL Draft, Spiller decided to return for his senior season in January 2009. He was projected as a first-round draft choice in the 2010 NFL Draft and was listed as the No. 1 running back of the 2010 class by ESPN.

Buffalo Bills
Spiller was selected 9th overall in the 2010 NFL Draft by the Buffalo Bills. He was the highest drafted Clemson player since Banks McFadden (1940 NFL Draft) and Gaines Adams (2007 NFL Draft), both of whom went fourth overall. On August 6, 2010 Spiller signed a five-year /$25 million deal ($20.8M guaranteed).

2010 season
On August 19, 2010, Spiller rushed 31 yards for his first NFL touchdown in week two of the preseason at the Rogers Centre in Toronto, Ontario, Canada against the Indianapolis Colts.

Spiller finished the 2010 preseason with 26 carries for 122 yards (4.69 average per carry) and three touchdowns. He also caught three passes for 35 yards. Spiller was named the #1 running back on Buffalo's final depth chart, ahead of the recently injured Marshawn Lynch and Fred Jackson. Lynch was later traded to the Seattle Seahawks.

On September 12, 2010, Spiller played in his first career NFL game in a home loss against the Miami Dolphins.

Spiller was named Special Teams player of the week for September 26, 2010 for a 95-yard touchdown return against the New England Patriots. Spiller also had a touchdown off a pass by Ryan Fitzpatrick. However, his rookie season was marked with disappointment as he scored no rushing touchdowns and accumulated fewer yards than running backs taken after him in the draft, including Ryan Mathews, Jahvid Best, and Toby Gerhart. For his rookie year in 2010, Spiller produced 283 rushing yards, 157 receiving yards, and 1189 return yards on 56 kickoff and punt return opportunities in 14 games (1 start).

2011 season
In 2011, it was announced that Spiller would trade numbers with Leodis McKelvin, receiving the number 28 in exchange for the number 21. Spiller wore number 28 at Clemson. Heading into Week 12, Spiller hadn't gotten as much action as the Bills were planning on because of the Pro Bowl caliber season that Fred Jackson was having, but Jackson was then placed on injured reserve, meaning Spiller would finally get his opportunity and become the Bills' starting running back for the rest of the season. In a Week 16 home game against the Denver Broncos on December 24, 2011, Spiller had the first 100-yard rushing game of his NFL career, rushing 16 times for 111 yards and a touchdown in a 40-14 win for the Bills. Spiller finished the year with 561 yards on 107 carries, with 4 rushing touchdowns and a 5.2 yards/carry average. He also recorded 39 receptions for 269 yards and 2 touchdowns.

2012 season

With Fred Jackson once again missing time due to injuries, Spiller took advantage of the opportunity to have a career year. In Week 15 against the Seattle Seahawks, Spiller reached the 1,000 yards rushing mark for the first time in his NFL career. He also only needed 154 carries to reach the mark - the fewest carries to 1,000 yards since Chicago Bears running back Beattie Feathers in 1934. Spiller rushed for 1,244 yards on only 207 carries and scored 6 touchdowns; his (6.009) yards per carry average (YPC) was second to Adrian Peterson's (6.025). He also caught 43 passes for 459 yards with two receiving touchdowns. Spiller was also elected to be in the Pro Bowl as an alternate for Baltimore Ravens running back Ray Rice, who participated in the Super Bowl.

2013 season
On August 27, 2013, Spiller took temporary leave from active status with the Bills to be with his family after the murder–suicide by his step-grandfather Hubert Allen, Jr. In 2013, Spiller rushed for 933 yards with 185 receiving yards in 15 games (10 starts).

2014 season

In Week 2 against the Miami Dolphins, Spiller returned a kickoff for a touchdown going 102 yards. For his efforts beyond that, Spiller was named the AFC Special Teams Player of the Week. On October 19, Spiller broke his collarbone against the Minnesota Vikings. He was placed on  injured reserve/designated to return on October 21, 2014. He returned to action against the Raiders in Week 16.

The 2014 season was a tumultuous year for the Bills' running backs, aside from Spiller's injury. Fellow running back Fred Jackson was also injured, leaving newly signed backs Anthony Dixon and Bryce Brown as the only healthy running backs for much of the season.

New Orleans Saints
On March 13, 2015, Spiller signed a four-year, $18 million contract with the New Orleans Saints. The deal included $9 million guaranteed. In a Week 4 game against the Dallas Cowboys, Spiller caught an 80-yard touchdown pass in overtime to win. It was Saints quarterback Drew Brees' 400th career touchdown pass. In Week 8 against the New York Giants, Spiller caught Brees' seventh touchdown pass of the game.

Spiller was a healthy scratch for their season opener in 2016 against the Oakland Raiders because fellow running backs Travaris Cadet and Daniel Lasco were playing bigger roles, according to coach Sean Payton. On September 13, 2016, Spiller was released.

Seattle Seahawks
On September 28, 2016, Spiller was signed by the Seattle Seahawks. He was released by the Seahawks on October 26, 2016.

New York Jets
On November 2, 2016, Spiller signed with the New York Jets. He was released by the team on December 6, 2016.

Kansas City Chiefs
On February 24, 2017, Spiller signed a one-year $980,000 contract with the Kansas City Chiefs. Throughout the 2017 season, Spiller was subject to multiple transactions causing him to be cut and signed multiple times, most recently being signed for the fifth time on January 2, 2018, the Chiefs ninth transaction in less than a year involving Spiller.

NFL career statistics

Coaching career

Clemson
Following his playing career, Spiller joined the coaching staff at Clemson as an unpaid graduate intern in 2020.

On February 5, 2021, Spiller was promoted to running backs coach at Clemson.

References

External links

 Clemson Tigers coach bio
Seattle Seahawks player bio
 New Orleans Saints player bio
 Clemson Tigers player bio
 

1987 births
Living people
All-American college football players
American football running backs
Buffalo Bills players
New Orleans Saints players
Clemson Tigers football coaches
Clemson Tigers football players
American Conference Pro Bowl players
Clemson Tigers men's track and field athletes
People from Lake Butler, Florida
Players of American football from Florida
Seattle Seahawks players
New York Jets players
Kansas City Chiefs players
African-American coaches of American football
African-American players of American football
21st-century African-American sportspeople
20th-century African-American people